Walter Berndt (November 22, 1899, – August 15, 1979) was a cartoonist known for his comic strip, Smitty, which he drew for 50 years.

Biography 
Bernt's job as an office boy at the New York Journal , which he took on after dropping out of high school in Brooklyn, put him in contact with leading cartoonists, as he recalled,

Fishing for ideas
Ed Black wrote about the method E. C. Segar and Berndt used to generate cartoon ideas:
Segar did another strip in the 1920s, but not on his own volition. One of his friends at the New York Journal was Walter Berndt who would in 1922 create the daily and Sunday Smitty strip for the Chicago Tribune-New York News Syndicate (under the aegis of the legendary Capt. Joseph Patterson), a feature destined to run for years. Both liked fishing. Berndt was doing a two-column strip called Then the Fun Began, inherited from Milt Gross. Both Segar and Berndt would finish their work by noon then steal away to an old pier on the Jersey side and spend the afternoon fishing and thinking up ideas. "We'd finish the day with a bunch of fish and about 15 or 20 ideas each," Berndt once said.

Then the Fun Began was appearing as early as March 3, 1919. When Berndt left that strip on October 13, 1921, it was taken over by Fred Faber, who continued it until 1928.

Origins of Smitty
Berndt's first strip, That's Different, drawn for the Bell Syndicate, lasted less than a year. In 1922, he created Smitty, which he continued until 1973, working with his assistant Charles Mueller. Yet it did not begin without a struggle, as cartoonist Mike Lynch described in a 2005 lecture:
After a stint drawing sports cartoons under T.A. "Tad" Dorgan (If you look at Walter Berndt's signature, you can see he draws his "T" just like Tad did), he took over the And the Fun Begins panel from Milt Gross. By 1920 Berndt had left the Journal to start his own strip. The strip lasted a year. Then he worked at the New York World. But, within weeks, he was fired for insubordination. (I tried to find out more about this, but this is all I know.) Berndt was out of work and broke. So, with zany cartoonist timing, he got married! And then he began making the rounds with a new strip titled Billy the Office Boy. It was 1922. The World Series was on. Big news, and so no one could get near the editors. Berndt couldn't get in to see anyone. Segar said there wasn't a World Series in Chicago and suggested he send the proposal to Captain Patterson. So Berndt mailed the strip to the Chicago Tribune. Patterson, opening a phone book for reference, renamed it Smitty and bought it at Berndt's high asking price. The strip became a mainstay, with the adventures of Smitty and Herby continuing for over 50 years.

He also produced the comic strip Herby, a topper strip of Smitty, from 1938 through 1960.

In 1937, Berndt moved to Port Jefferson, Long Island, where he lived until his death at age 79. He died on Monday, August 15, 1979, at Mather Memorial Hospital in Port Jefferson,

Awards
Berndt won the Reuben Award for 1969 for Smitty.

Legacy: The Berndt Toast Gang

The Berndt Toast Gang, named in honor of Walter Berndt, is a group of Long Island cartoonists who meet on the last Thursday of each month, as explained by cartoonist Lee Ames:

References

Further reading
Strickler, Dave. Syndicated Comic Strips and Artists, 1924-1995: The Complete Index. Cambria, California: Comics Access, 1995.

External links 
 Lambiek Comiclopedia
Billy Ireland Cartoon Library & Museum Art Database

1899 births
1979 deaths
American comic strip cartoonists
American comics writers
Chicago Tribune people
Artists from Brooklyn
People from Port Jefferson, New York
Reuben Award winners